Pristurus insignis, also known as Blanford's rock gecko, is a species of lizard in the Sphaerodactylidae family found on Socotra Island.

References

Pristurus
Reptiles described in 1881